Belzec, Sobibor, Treblinka: the Operation Reinhard Death Camps is a 1987 book by Israeli historian Yitzhak Arad which discusses Operation Reinhard and the extermination camps of Belzec, Sobibor, and Treblinka. It was published in Hebrew by Yad Vashem, and in English by Indiana University Press. In contrast to Raul Hilberg, Arad paid more attention to the Jewish response to persecution.

In 1999, Michael Berkowitz noted that "this book no longer represents the cutting edge of scholarship". As recently as 2019, the book is still being used as the basis of research on the Holocaust.

References

Further reading

1987 non-fiction books
Books published by Yad Vashem
Books about the Holocaust
Case studies
Indiana University Press books
Operation Reinhard